There were two special elections to the United States Senate in 2013; ordered by election date:

Race summary

Massachusetts (special) 

A special election was held June 25, 2013 to fill the Class 2 seat for the remainder of the term ending January 3, 2015.

The vacancy that prompted the special election was created by the resignation of Senator John Kerry, in order to become U.S. Secretary of State. On January 30, 2013, Governor Deval Patrick chose his former Chief of Staff Mo Cowan to serve as interim U.S. Senator. Cowan declined to participate in the election. A party primary election was held April 30 to determinate the nominees of each party for the general election. The Massachusetts Democrats nominated congressman Ed Markey, while the Massachusetts Republicans nominated Gabriel E. Gomez, a businessman and former Navy SEAL.

The special primary elections took place on April 30. Democratic Congressman Ed Markey and Republican businessman Gabriel E. Gomez won their respective primaries.

New Jersey (special) 

A special election was held October 16, 2013 to fill the Class 2 seat for the remainder of the term ending January 3, 2015.  The vacancy resulted from the death of five-term Democrat Frank Lautenberg on June 3, 2013. In the interim, the seat was held by Republican Senator Jeffrey Chiesa, who was appointed on June 6, 2013 by New Jersey Governor Chris Christie to serve until the elected winner was sworn in. At the time of his appointment, Chiesa, then New Jersey's Attorney General, announced that he would not be a candidate in the special election.

Following Lautenberg's death, there was a great deal of speculation and controversy over when a special election would or could be scheduled, but the following day, June 4, 2013, Christie announced that the primary would take place on August 13, 2013, and the special election on October 16, 2013. Christie was criticized for scheduling a separate election for Senate when a gubernatorial election was already taking place in November. In the primary elections, the Republicans nominated former Bogota Mayor Steve Lonegan and the Democrats nominated Newark Mayor Cory Booker. Booker led in every opinion poll and the race was called for him at approximately 9:45pm EDT on October 16, 2013. Booker resigned as Mayor of Newark and was sworn in on October 31, 2013 to become the junior U.S. senator from New Jersey.

The special primary elections took place on August 13. Former Republican Mayor of Bogota Steve Lonegan and Democratic Mayor of Newark Cory Booker won their respective primaries. They faced off against six Independent/Third Party candidates in the October 16, 2013 general election.

References 

 
2013